Curuçá is a municipality in the state of Pará in the Northern region of Brazil.

Curuçá was founded in 1775, but only became a city in 1895.
Some of the municipality was split off into separate municipalities in 1939, 1955 and 1991.
The Curuçá River flows from south to north through the municipality, emptying into the Atlantic Ocean.
The municipality contains the  Mãe Grande de Curuçá Extractive Reserve, created in 2002, which protects the waters and banks of the estuary.

See also
 List of municipalities in Pará

References

Municipalities in Pará
Populated coastal places in Pará